The Symphony No. 3 in C major, Op. 52, by Jean Sibelius is a symphony in three movements composed in 1907. Coming between the romantic intensity of Sibelius's first two symphonies and the more austere complexity of his later symphonies, it is a good-natured, triumphal, and deceptively simple-sounding piece. The symphony's first performance was given by the Helsinki Philharmonic Society, conducted by the composer, on 25 September 1907. In the same concert, his suite from the incidental music to Belshazzar's Feast, Op. 51, was also performed for the first time. It is dedicated to the British composer Granville Bantock, an early champion of his work in the UK.

The first recording featured the Finnish conductor Robert Kajanus and the London Symphony Orchestra, for the HMV label in June 1932.

Composition 
The Third Symphony represents a turning point in Sibelius's symphonic output. His First and Second symphonies are grandiose Romantic and patriotic works. The Third, however, shows a distinct, almost Classical desire to contain the largest amount of musical material in the fewest possible melodic figures, harmonies, and durations. This musical economy is most apparent in the first movement, almost reminiscent of Beethoven in its clear and cleanly developed sections. A typical performance of the whole symphony runs slightly under 30 minutes.

Instrumentation
The piece is scored for an orchestra including 2 flutes, 2 oboes, 2 clarinets (in B and A), 2 bassoons, 4 horns (in F), 2 trumpets (in B), 3 trombones, timpani, and strings.

Movements

I. Allegro moderato

The symphony opens with a strident and rhythmic melody in the celli and double basses, after the announcement of which the brass and the remaining strings enter in turn. The C–F tritone, which plays such an important role in both this and the next symphony, is clearly articulated and emphasised as early as the beginning of bar 15 by a rinforzando marking.

A lilting, almost folk-like flute solo gives way to a horn call over brush-like strings in the first of three major climaxes in the first movement.

After this rush of sound, the gentle serenity of the opening is recalled by the celli once again, but this time in a more vulnerable and sostenuto manner in the more remote key of B minor.

From this point, the music gently winds down. Then, a succession of woodwind instruments recall the second cello melody over soft string scales, which repeatedly recall the opening of the movement. The tension grows and finally explodes into the opening theme, underscored by timpani, the violins playing over a pulsating cushion of brass-and-woodwind chorales and offbeat pizzicatos in the cellos. The flute theme is once again recalled, and the second cello theme is re-stated by the entire orchestra; played in the string section, the timpani and woodwind provide rhythmic material while more brass chorales are sustained throughout the section.

The music once again winds down, but this time, before it is let go completely, a flute and horn chorale lead into more recollections of past themes, before the movement closes with two two-chord plagal cadences in E minor (a chord of A minor followed by a chord of E minor), which, because there is no F in either chord, leave the F–F dichotomy (set up by the C–F tritone near the beginning of the work) unresolved;

this dichotomy is then finally resolved (for the time-being) by a single plagal cadence in C (F major, then C major).

II. Andantino con moto, quasi allegretto
The opening of the second movement is a nocturne. The first section almost waltzes out of the pervading darkness, but, in a constrained manner, the music refuses to do so.

Commentators disagree over exactly what form the structure of this movement represents; however the four appearances of the theme with developmental episodes suggest a kind of rondo. After the extended introduction, a brief moment of lightness gives way to the string section taking over the theme, with comments from woodwinds and horns. The music is propelled to the end by perpetual cello pizzicatos, and then the second movement ends in several string pulses in which the tune is still almost recognizable.

III. Moderato
The last movement is really two movements compacted into a single finale. Sibelius described it as "the crystallisation of ideas from chaos". The opening contains thematic fragments from previous material and of material yet to come.

A hushed, tense scherzo breaks into a chorale (with a prominent C–F tritone) which is repeated several times.

The coda brings the chorale-type theme into greater and greater expanses, until the symphony concludes in a compendium of the chorale theme and a rush of string figures and woodwind scales. The cadence brings the piece to an almost abrupt halt with a single, arpeggiated C major triad in the brass.

See also

References

Further reading
 Pike, Lionel. Beethoven, Sibelius and 'the Profound Logic'. London: The Athlone Press, 1978. .

External links 

Symphony 3
1907 compositions
Compositions in C major
Music dedicated to benefactors or patrons